Cuxland, in a tourist sense, is the land between the River Weser and the mouth of the Elbe in the district of Cuxhaven on Germany's North Sea coast.

Concept 
The term Cuxland is an artificial word that has purely been coined for tourist purposes and has no historic significance. It particularly refers to the resorts of the Land Wursten like Dorum, Wremen and Midlum, but also the town of Cuxhaven and resorts of Sahlenburg, Duhnen within its borough Döse, as well as the town of Otterndorf.

Tourism 
The central attractions of Cuxland are Sahlenburg, Duhnen und Döse, which have a well developed tourist infrastructure with restaurants and hotels to cater for various tastes, holiday apartments, an open air pool, leisure facilities and shops. 

The majority of the holidaymakers come from the German states of Lower Saxony, North Rhine-Westphalia, Bremen and Hamburg. With around 3 million overnight stays each year, Cuxhaven is the leading resort in Germany. The coastal villages in the collective municipality of Land Wursten and in the borough of Otterndorf are especially popular with families. Inland, spa facilities, cycling and riding are popular; the centre being Bad Bederkesa.

Use of the term "Cuxland" 
A local holiday park company secured the rights to the word "Cuxland" since 1997 as a brand. 

In summer 2008 there were disputes about this. In connexion with that the county council decided in favour of the general and wide use of the term "Cuxland".

External links 

 Cuxland website
 Website of Cuxhaven county
 

Regions of Lower Saxony
Cuxhaven (district)